Trupanion is a pet insurance provider based in Seattle, Washington, that offers and administers cat and dog insurance, in the United States, Canada, Australia, and Puerto Rico. Founded in 1998, Trupanion offers comprehensive insurance plans that covers hereditary & congenital conditions. The company also provides unlimited annual caps, customizable deductibles, and vet direct payments. Trupanion is self-underwritten by the American Pet Insurance Company (APIC).

History
Trupanion was founded by current CEO Darryl Rawlings as Vetinsurance in Canada in 1999. Trupanion became the first North American pet insurance company to provide its own underwriting.

In 2007, Trupanion raised $22 million from Maveron, RenaissanceRe and a large private equity group. A Series B round was completed in 2008 and in 2011 the company completed a $9 million Series C round of financing led by the Highland Consumer Fund.

In 2014, the company went public and raised $71 million during its IPO.  In October 2020, Trupanion completed a PIPE funding round for $200 million.  Trupanion ended the 2020 fiscal year with 862,928 pets enrolled and $502 million in revenue. 

PHI Direct and Furkin

In 2021, Trupanion launched two new pet insurances products: PHI Direct and Furkin. Both insurance products were launched in Canada.  These pet medical insurance policies were designed to be offered online at different price points than Trupanion coverage. 

PHI Direct is the first pet insurance in Canada to accept PayPal and Apple Pay. Furkin’s policy has no per condition limits and offers 24-hour telehealth support via Vetsdirect Limited and Petriage.

Accreditation
Trupanion is a founding member of the North American Pet Health Insurance Association (NAPHIA) which educates pet owners in North America about the veterinary industry. Trupanion was the first pet insurance company to be awarded the AAHA's Seal of Acceptance in 2008.

Vet Direct Pay 
Trupanion was the first pet insurance company to build technology that enables clients to avoid reimbursements with the company paying veterinary bills directly.

Company culture
In 2010, The Seattle Times Company (NWJobs.com) named Trupanion Seattle's ‘Most Pet-Friendly Company’ based on the ability of employees to bring their pets to work, and the full-time dog walking company, that works exclusively for Trupanion, to walk employees’ dogs. The Seattle Times also named Trupanion the company with the ‘Most Unusual Perk’ for offering employees the option of insuring their dog or cat with a $0 deductible. Trupanion was also awarded the ‘Best Place to Work’ and ‘Best Local Business’ in the 2010 Best of KOMO Communities survey, developed by KOMO News.

In 2011 The Huffington Post named Trupanion as one of nine companies across the nation that support a healthy work-life balance for their employees; other companies on the list included Google, Netflix, and Zappos.

On August 9, 2012, The Puget Sound Business Journal announced Washington's Best Workplaces at Safeco Field in Seattle and awarded Trupanion Washington's Best Workplaces 2012 Large Company Bronze Medal.

Charitable donations
In May 2011, Trupanion entered an agreement with the American Humane Association in support of the Second Chance Fund, a program that provides financial assistance to animal welfare organizations. In August 2012, American Humane Association announced Trupanion's sponsorship of the service dog category in the 2012 American Humane Association Hero Dog Awards.

References

External links
 Official website
 Official blog
 American Pet Insurance Company

American companies established in 1999
Financial services companies established in 1999
Insurance companies of the United States
Companies listed on the Nasdaq
Companies based in Seattle
Pet insurance
Financial services companies of the United States